The Danish Address Register (DAR; Danish: Danmarks Adresseregister) is the authoritative registry of all streets and addresses in Denmark.

The data is maintained by the local municipalities, and the central IT platform is provided by the Agency for Data Supply and Efficiency, a part of the Ministry of Climate, Energy and Utilities.

Data is provided free of charge for any purpose via download or web services.

External link 
  The Danish Address Register. Agency for Data Supply and Efficiency.

References 

Geography of Denmark
Society of Denmark
Government databases in Denmark